XHCHIL-FM is a community radio station on 106.1 FM in Chilchota, Michoacán. It is known as Radio Eraxamani. Eraxamani originally broadcast as a pirate on 97.3 MHz. The concession for 106.1 was approved on October 4, 2017, with the station signing on February 3, 2018.

References

Radio stations in Michoacán
Community radio stations in Mexico
Radio stations established in 2018
2018 establishments in Mexico